Albania was represented at the 2004 Summer Olympics in Athens by the National Olympic Committee of Albania.

Athletics

Albanian athletes have so far achieved qualifying standards in the following athletics events (up to a maximum of three athletes in each event at the 'A' Standard, and one at the 'B' Standard). 

Key
 Note – Ranks given for track events are within the athlete's heat only
 Q = Qualified for the next round
 q = Qualified for the next round as a fastest loser or, in field events, by position without achieving the qualifying target
 NR = National record
 N/A = Round not applicable for the event
 Bye = Athlete not required to compete in round

Men

Women

Swimming

Men

Women

Weightlifting

Wrestling

Key
  - Victory by Fall.
  - Decision by Points - the loser with technical points.
  - Decision by Points - the loser without technical points.

Men's freestyle

See also
 Albania at the 2005 Mediterranean Games

References

External links
Official Report of the XXVIII Olympiad
Sports Reference
National Olympic Committee of Albania 

Nations at the 2004 Summer Olympics
2004
Summer Olympics